Verdi is an unincorporated community located in Verdi Township, Lincoln County, Minnesota, United States. Verdi appears on the Verdi U.S. Geological Survey Map.

History
Verdi was platted in 1879. It was named in honor of composer Giuseppe Verdi, and from the fact in Italian, verd means "green". A post office was established at Verdi in 1879, and remained in operation until it was discontinued in 1997.

Residents of the town pronounce it "Verd-eye" rather than "Verd-ee."

References

Unincorporated communities in Lincoln County, Minnesota
Unincorporated communities in Minnesota
Populated places established in 1879
1879 establishments in Minnesota